"One Candle" is a song performed by South Korean boy band g.o.d. It is from their third album Chapter 3 (2000), and has since become one of their most widely-known songs.

Music
The lyrics and music were composed by Park Jin-young. He stated that the lyrics were inspired by a quote he saw on graffiti while visiting New York City: "Better to light a candle than curse the darkness." The song was promoted alongside the title track "Lies". At that time, the group was not managed by his company JYP Entertainment but he worked closely with them as a producer and songwriter. The accompanying soundtrack was also included in the album and was arranged by composer and music producer Bang Si-hyuk, who went on to establish Big Hit Entertainment. 

The song is unusual as it opens with a spoken narration by Danny Ahn introducing the theme of the song, followed by Yoon Kye-sang and Son Ho-young rapping the verse. The chorus is sung in the American gospel style. During performances, the audience is often encouraged to clap along.

Reception and commercial performance
The immense success of the album's title track "Lies" largely overshadowed "One Candle", which did not garner any recognition or awards despite being one of two songs promoted alongside "Lies" when the album was first released. Despite this the song has since become well-known both within South Korea and the Korean diaspora in the United States. 

Already a popular and familiar noraebang song, "One Candle" charted in the Gaon Music Charts for the first time when g.o.d reunited in July 2014, following a nine-year hiatus. It reached #80 in the Digital Chart and peaked at #70 in the Noraebang Chart.

In popular culture
"Sky Blue Promise" (하늘색 약속), one of the pre-released songs from g.o.d's 15th anniversary album Chapter 8, heavily references "One Candle". It was a homage to their past hits and utilizes several lines from "One Candle" as well as the rhythm.

As "One Candle" is considered one of g.o.d's best known songs, it is frequently referred to whenever a member appears on television. Danny Ahn, Son Ho-young and Kim Tae-woo performed it together during their appearance on the Mnet music talk show The Playlist. Ahn performed his own rap part in his drama The Three Witches during a scene in which his character marries Shin Dong-mi's character. The song was referenced during Yoon Kye-sang's appearance Saturday Night Live Korea in which his character from The Outlaws, mobster Jang Chen, starts composing his own poem (by directly quoting the first verse of "One Candle").

In 2016 "One Candle" gained notoriety as one of many songs sung at candlelight rallies and protests calling for the removal of President Park Geun-hye, leading cultural commentators to later quip that the song's lyrics was prophetic of current times despite being written over fifteen years ago.

Notable cover versions
The upbeat melody and recognizable chorus have led the song to become popular with street performers. Traveling British busker Aancod Zaccarelli, who previously lived in South Korea as a teenager, sang the song accompanied by his guitar on a platform at the Seoul National University Station. Subsequent videos of the sizeable crowds of commuters singing and clapping along with him were uploaded on social media and went viral. The videos caught the attention of g.o.d leader Park Joon-hyung, who publicly complimented him during a press conference. He was invited to g.o.d's 15th anniversary concert series and performed on July 12, 2014 as the opening act.

The song has been covered numerous times by younger artists and sung at year-end ceremonies and festivals as an encore song. It was performed at the 2015 KBS Drama Awards by nominees for the Best New Actor and Actress awards and all participants at the 2016 KBS Song Festival during the opening stage. Other notable cover versions include:
Katie Kim (K-pop Star season 4, Top 6 round)
Park Ji-yeon, JB, Park Seo-joon and Ailee in the television series Dream High 2
Son Seung-yeon and friends (winner of Immortal Songs: Singing the Legend episode 229)
Yook Joong-wan and Lee Joo-hyuk (winner of MBC's Duet Song Festival episode 44)

References

g.o.d songs
2000 songs
Korean-language songs
Songs written by Park Jin-young